Mo'Nique's Fat Chance was a reality TV miniseries. It featured 10 plus-sized women competing in a beauty pageant to become "Miss F.A.T.," which is explained as "Fabulous and Thick." It is hosted by actress Mo'Nique and aired from 2005 to 2007 on the Oxygen network.

2005 edition

The first season premiered August 6, 2005, on Oxygen.

Among the prizes were: a participate in a professional photo shoot, be featured in a Just My Size catalog, win a closet filled with the latest Just My Size Fashions and a week long boot camp designed to showcase inner and outer beauty.

The winner of the 2005 edition of Mo'Nique's Fat Chance was the late Joanne Borgella, who was subsequently a semi-finalist on season 7 of American Idol. The judges were Kevin Lennox, Shaquille O'Neal and Mia Tyler.

2006 edition
The 2006 winner of the competition was Tanisha Malone.

Contestants

 Evie Marsala
 Frances Galvan
 Gia Gigliette
 Janelle Gilbert
 Kahlia Johnson
 Sara Barrios
 Shawnti Eaden
 Tanisha Malone
 Tiffany Jones
 Victoria Mao

2007 edition
The third season took place in Paris, France, and premiered July 28, 2007, on Oxygen with 10 episodes. The season's judges were Velvet D'Amour, Mikki Taylor and Sylvie Fabregon.

External links
 
 

Oxygen (TV channel) original programming
Modeling-themed reality television series
African-American reality television series
Fitness reality television series
Obesity in the United States
2005 American television series debuts
2007 American television series endings
2000s American reality television series
English-language television shows